Marcel Barencey (1893–1971) was a French stage and film actor. He is often credited simply as Barencey.

He was married to the actress Odette Barencey.

Selected filmography
 The Marriage of Mademoiselle Beulemans (1927)
 Monsieur Albert (1932)
 Aces of the Turf (1932)
 Night Shift (1932)
 Clochard (1932)
 Rasputin (1938)

References

Bibliography
 Goble, Alan. The Complete Index to Literary Sources in Film. Walter de Gruyter, 1999.

External links

People from Vesoul
1893 births
1971 deaths
French male television actors
French male film actors